This is a list of Armenian ethnic enclaves, containing cities, districts, and neighborhoods with predominantly Armenian population, or are associated with Armenian culture, either currently or historically. Most numbers are estimates by various organizations and media, because many countries simply do not collect data on ethnicity.

Extant enclaves

Europe

Middle East
Syria
There are several Armenian-populated villages in Syria: including Aramo, Al-Ghanimeh (Ghnemieh), Kessab (2,000–2,200) in Latakia; and Yakubiyah in Idlib. Aleppo has the Armenian neighborhoods of Al-Jdayde and Nor Kyough (Midan).

other countries

Post-Soviet states
 (de facto)
As of 2004, there were "around 50-60 Armenian villages" in Abkhazia. According to the 2011 Abkhazian census, Armenians formed the majority of the population of the Sukhumi District (6,467 Armenians, 56.1% of the total 11,531), and plurality in Gulripshi District (8,430 Armenians or 46.8% of 18,032) and Gagra District (15,422 Armenians or 38.3% of 40,217).

Russia

United States

Extinct enclaves

See also 
 Armenian diaspora
 Ethnic enclave

Notes

References